Bead lily is a common name for several flowering plant species in genus Clintonia, including:

 Clintonia andrewsiana, Andrews' bead lily, also known as the red bead lily
 Clintonia borealis, the blue bead-lily
 Clintonia uniflora, the queen's cup bead lily, or simply beadlily